Mesozoicaphididae is an extinct family of aphids in the order Hemiptera. There are at least four genera and about seven described species in Mesozoicaphididae.

Genera
These four genera belong to the family Mesozoicaphididae:
 † Albertaphis Heie, 1992
 † Calgariaphis Heie, 1992
 † Campaniaphis Heie, 1992
 † Mesozoicaphis Heie, 1992

References

Sternorrhyncha
Prehistoric insect families